Among the Edomite kings of Genesis 36, Bela ben Beor is the first of the apparently elective kings. The dates of his reign are unknown.

References 

Kings of Edom
Book of Genesis people